Hawaiian Tropic is an American brand of suntan lotion.

Hawaiian Tropic was founded by Ron Rice in 1969. Hawaiian Tropic became the largest private manufacturer of sun care products in the United States. The company was acquired by Playtex Products, Inc. in May 2007. With Hawaiian Tropic and Playtex's Banana Boat brand, Playtex became the largest manufacturer of sun care products in the Western Hemisphere. Shortly after purchasing Hawaiian Tropic, Playtex Products was purchased by Energizer Holdings Inc. in a deal valued at $1.9 billion.

Restaurant 
In late 2006, a theme restaurant called Hawaiian Tropic Zone opened in New York City near Times Square. The restaurant was advertised as the "Hottest Place on Earth" and featured waitresses in bikinis designed by Nicole Miller and a restaurant menu created by chef David Burke. Later that year, four former employees sued the restaurant, alleging repeated groping by managers, as well as rape. The restaurant closed in mid-2010.

Miss Hawaiian Tropic International 

Hawaiian Tropic sponsored swimsuit competitions among women to select spokesmodels for its products. Many winners appeared later in advertising campaigns, swimwear, erotic magazines, and lingerie catalogs.

In May 2008, the Hawaiian Tropic Brand celebrated the 25th annual Miss Hawaiian Tropic International model search finals at the Golden Nugget Hotel and Casino in Las Vegas. In late 2008, the pageants ended in the United States. The former state directors transitioned to Swimsuit USA, which is the official successor.

Notable winners

Miss Hawaiian Tropic USA 
Rebecca DiPietro 2005: Former World Wrestling Entertainment backstage interviewer on ECW and Playboy model; finalist in Hawaiian Tropic International 2005 pageant
Shana Hiatt 1995: Hostess for the World Poker Tour and Playboy model
Ashley Massaro 2002: Former WWE Diva and Playboy cover girl
Crista Nicole 2001: Playboy Playmate of the Month for May 2001
Brooke Richards 1998: Playboy Playmate of the Month for December 1999
Suzanne Stokes 1999: Playboy Playmate of the Month for February 2000

Miss Hawaiian Tropic Canada 
Ashley Massaro 2004: Former WWE Diva and Playboy cover girl
Maryse Ouellet 2003: WWE Diva and Playboy model
Crystel Geoffré 2005

Miss Hawaiian Tropic International 
Cecilia Hörberg 1984: Top 10 at Miss World 1988, representing Sweden
Jennifer Campbell 1989: actress and model
XiXi Yang Miss China 2008: international spokesmodel, U.S. media personality/TV host; appeared in MTV, VH1, and NBC

Hawaiian Tropic Teen Miss 
Casey Reinhardt 2003: former cast member of the second season of Laguna Beach and frequent beauty pageant contestant

Other contestants and winners 
Gia Allemand: reality television contestant and actress who also appeared in Maxim
Anna Anka, (née Åberg) Sweden, Top 10 1993: model, actress, author. Married to the musician Paul Anka
Marea Lambert-Barker Australia: actress, TV host, radio announcer, model
Brooke Adams, former ECW performer
Martina Andrews, Miss Hooters International 2004
Michelle Banzer: Miss Kentucky USA 2007
Laura Morgan Porter: Miss Tennessee Hawaiian Tropic 2006, 2003 Sports Illustrated Swimsuit Cover finalist, one of the three official NASCAR Pit Crew girls from 2009 to 2011
Jillian Beyor: Playboy Cyber Girl, Cyber Girl of Month May 2007, Cyber Girl of Week January 1, 2007, and Coed of Month October 2006
Barbara Blank: 2005 model; WWE diva under the ring name Kelly Kelly
Jennifer Etcheson: Miss Hawaiian Tropic California 2005, Miss Hawaiian Tropic International Finalist 2005, Strikeforce MMA Ring Girl, model and actress
Angel Boris: actress and Playboy Playmate of the Month for July 1996
Jennifer Cole: actress and model
Bonnie Conte was Miss Miami Beach Hawaiian Tropic
Louise Glover: former Playboy Special Editions "Model of the Year"
Sandra Hubby: Playboy Playmate of the Month for March 2004
Dalene Kurtis: Playboy Playmate of the Month for September 2001 and one of People magazine's 50 most beautiful people in 2004
Sung Hi Lee: actress and very popular Playboy Special Editions model, featured in Playboy magazine's "Girls of Hawaiian Tropic" issue in 1995 and the companion video
Rochelle Loewen: former WWE diva and Playboy model; made cameo appearances on The Girls Next Door
Tilsa Lozano: Miss Playboy TV Latinoamerica & Iberia 2008, Playboy TV actress
Cassandra Lynn: Playboy Playmate of the Month for February 2006
Holly Madison: Playboy model and Hugh Hefner's former #1 girlfriend
Marla Maples:
Yael Markovich: Miss International Israel 2012 and Miss Supranational Israel 
Kalin Olson: Playboy Playmate of the Month for August 1997
Jocelyn Oxlade: model, singer, host, FHM Babe (Philippines); turned down a Playboy magazine offer worth $25,000 due to some personal reasons
Kirsten Price: nude model, contestant of the reality program My Bare Lady, porn star
Tiffany Selby: model and member of the USA National Bikini Team
Andrea Stelzer
Tiffany Taylor: Playboy Playmate of the Month for November 1998
Jennifer Thomas: Washington's finalist in the Miss Hawaiian Tropic USA competition in 2000; professional wrestler
Jamie Westenhiser: Playboy Playmate of the Month for May 2005

Competition hosts

References

External links
 
 Hawaiian Tropic Zone restaurant
 Hawaiian Tropic Zone review in New York Magazine

Personal care brands
Beauty pageants in the United States
Products introduced in 1969
1969 establishments in the United States
Edgewell Personal Care
Sunscreen brands